The Netherlands national under-16 basketball team is the national junior representative for the Netherlands in international under-16 basketball tournaments. They are governed by Basketball Nederland. The team competes at the FIBA U16 European Championship, with the opportunity to qualify for the FIBA Under-17 World Cup. The current coach is Radenko Varagic.

See also
Netherlands men's national basketball team
Netherlands men's national under-18 basketball team

References

External links
Official website 
FIBA profile

Basketball teams in the Netherlands
Men's national under-16 basketball teams
basketball